Kashi railway station is one of the railway stations in Varanasi district. Kashi railway station serves the Eastern suburbs of Varanasi district and serves as major secondary railway station to Varanasi and Mughalsarai railway stations.

General
Kashi railway station has three platforms. Four double Electrified tracks pass through the station. On average, two trains originate and thirty-eight trains halt at this station daily.

Modernization
The railways redeveloped the station, coming up with the modern amenities. The station was upgraded with beautiful walls, waiting rooms, circulating areas and a foot overbridge (FOB). The walls of station were coated with beautiful religious and cultural paintings. LEDs were also added to get over poor lighting and decorative lights were used to enhance the beautification at night. For up-gradation, up to Rs. 1 Crore was spent.

Plans
Due to heavy traffic congestion and growing industry demands in Varanasi, Kashi railway station was chosen for Intermodal Station (IMS) by National Highways Authority of India (NHAI). The Intermodal station will be integrated with various transportation modes, such as rail, road, mass rapid transit system, bus rapid transit system, and inland waterways. It will be developed under public–private partnership. The area required for development of Intermodal Station (IMS) is estimated to be 47.26 acres.

See also
Varanasi Junction railway station
Banaras railway station
Varanasi City railway station

References

External links

Railway stations in Varanasi
Lucknow NR railway division